Tirukamesvarar Temple is a Siva temple in Ponnur in Tiruvannamalai district in Tamil Nadu (India).

Vaippu Sthalam
It is one of the shrines of the Vaippu Sthalams sung by Tamil Saivite Nayanar Sundarar.

Presiding deity
The presiding deity is Tirukamesvarar and also Parasaresvarar. The Goddess is known as Santanayaki.

Speciality
This temple was built by Pallavas. Inscriptions of Kulottunga Chola, Vijayanagara kings and Pandya king Sundara Pandya are found in this temple.

References

Hindu temples in Tiruvannamalai district
Shiva temples in Tiruvannamalai district